The hydrology of Hungary, is mostly determined by Hungary's lying in the middle of the Carpathian Basin, half surrounded by the Carpathian Mountains. All parts of the country have some outflow. All surface water gravitates towards its southern center, and from there, is united in the Danube, which flows into the Black Sea. The whole of Hungary lies within the Danube drainage basin.

The annual water balance of the country shows a surplus. From that, precipitation amounts for only 10%, the rest being provided by the incoming rivers of surrounding countries.

Rivers

Hydro graphically Hungary can be divided into two roughly equal parts: the drainage basins of the Danube and the Tisza.

The present network of Hungary's rivers began to take shape at the end of the Tertiary and the beginning of the Quaternary periods when the Pannonian Sea retreated from the basin.

The rivers in Hungary reach their lowest level at the end of the summer, the beginning of the autumn, or sometimes in the winter.

Both the Danube and the Tisza have two regular floods each year, the early spring "icy flood" and the early summer "green flood". The "icy flood" is the result of the thaw in the mountains surrounding the Carpathian Basin, when the rivers in the plain are usually still frozen. Before the river flows were controlled, the piled-up ice sheets of the river could form tremendous barriers, which in turn could cause devastating floods. This phenomenon can still be a real danger after cold winters, and a small fleet of icebreakers is used on the two rivers to fight against ice barrages. The "green" flood in the early summer carries a much larger amount of water, not only the torrents from the Alps, but also the surface runoff water from the May and June rains.

Danube

History
The primeval Danube first silted up the basin of the Pannonian Sea which now forms the Eastern Slovak Lowland on the left bank of the river and the Little Hungarian Plain on the right bank. It flowed towards the south into Transdanubia and then followed the present-day course of the Drava into an interior lake system in the south of the present Great Plain. Later the Danube was diverted to the east by tectonic uplift, finding an outlet through the Visegrád gap. During the Quaternary the Great Plain continued to sink, meanwhile the Börzsöny and the Visegrád mountains were rising. Once through the gorge, the Danube fanned out into the Great Hungarian Plain, depositing alluvial cones. The present north-south course was formed by the river in the late Pleistocene.

Geography
The Danube is the second longest river in Europe, after the Volga. Its upper flow is outside of Hungary, but its middle section starts at Devín, close to the Hungarian border. This section of the river stretches until the Iron Gate, between Serbia and Romania. The lower section of the river crosses the Romanian Plain and flows into the Black Sea through a delta.

Navigation
The Danube is navigable for the whole of its course through Hungary with a minimum  depth.

Flow and flooding
The Danube has been mostly controlled since the 19th century. No stretch of land along the river is left open to the floods.

Tributaries
The right-hand tributaries of the Danube inside Hungary do not add greatly to its volume. The largest are the Lajta, the Rába, the Rábca and the Marcal. The Sárvíz is joined by the Sió which drains Lake Balaton. The Sió is also fed by the river Kapos.

The only right-hand tributary of any considerable volume is the Drava, which forms also on a large stretch the Hungarian-Croatian border, but joins the Danube already inside Croatia.

Tisza

History
The present course of the Tisza was established relatively recently in geological time. Until the end of the Pleistocene it flowed along the southern border of the Nyírség area in north-eastern Hungary, but later it changed its flow forming a right-angled bend to the north of the Nyírség. The Tisza and its tributaries built up very large, but flat alluvial cones along the edges of the Great Plain.

Geography
The drainage basin of the Tisza is in the eastern part of the Carpathian Basin.  of this is in Hungary, mostly lowland. In spite of regulation, the Tisza still has a characteristically wide meanders through the flood plain with sand dunes, wide forests and oxbow lakes, some cut off artificially, some naturally. In Hungary the Tisza is a sluggish river with a very gentle gradient. The volume of water in the Tisza fluctuates even more than that in the Danube because the catchment area is mostly medium-height mountains, and not by high mountains with permanent snow.

Flow and flooding
The Tisza has three floods yearly, the early spring flood from the snow thaw, then the early summer "green flood", brought on by the summer rain, and then a minor flood in the autumn. Its lowest level is in winter.

The length of the Tisza dykes now exceeds .

Navigation
The Tisza is navigable for smaller vessels right up to Dombrád near the north-eastern frontier of the country. In the Trans-Tisza Region (east of the river) extensive areas are irrigated by its water.

Tributaries
The last and largest tributary of the Tisza within Hungary is the Maros.

Among the tributaries of the Tisza the most important on the right side is the Bodrog, which flows into the Tisza at Tokaj. Their confluence has often changed, as is graphically illustrated by the extensive oxbow lakes and belts of shallows in the vicinity of Tokaj.

The next right-hand tributary of the Tisza is the Hornád, which receives earlier also the waters of the Bódva and the Sajó. Below Tiszafüred the river takes up the Eger river and at Szolnok the Zagyva which already collected the waters of Galga and Tápió. To the south from this point no more streams run into the Tisza from the ridge which separates it from the Danube. The eastern slope of this ridge is only broken by dried-out valleys.

The more significant left-hand tributes of the Tisza include the Szamos with the Kraszna, the Körös, which is usually called Treble Körös, because it gathers up the water of several minor rivers, (White Körös, Black Körös, Rapid Körös, Berettyó and the Hortobágy river). Before the great river controls of the 19th century this region was an almost endless stretch of marshlands and fens. Today there is a system of irrigation canals in the area.

Canals

The river is spelt Tisa in other languages. In Hungarian the spelling is Tisza, but it is not assonated.

In the late 19th century, during the large-scale controls, canal systems were also created partly as artificial waterways, partly to help the agricultural use of land, and partly to conduct away superfluous inland water. The most important canal of Transdanubia is the  Sió connecting Lake Balaton and the Danube. The Hanság Canal goes across a boggy land between the Lake Fertő and the Danube.

Lakes

Hungary is not very rich in lakes, and their basins are no older than the late Pleistocene. There is no really deep lake in the country.

Lake Balaton is the biggest in Central Europe.

Evaporation from the lake is greater than the inflow from small rivers and streams. The deficit is compensated by rainwater and underground sources. The occasional surplus water leaves the lake through the canalised Sió.

The northern shore is more varied, with the Tihany Peninsula, and it has steeper beach shelves.

At the lake the summertime is long, beginning in May and lingering to the end of September. The water temperature does not sink below  to in the summer even if there is a cold front. This enormous body of water creates a very pleasant mesoclimate on the shores of the lake.

Sudden storms can whip up dangerous, steep waves on the surface of the lake.

The lake freezes almost every winter, the thickness of the ice can reach , which creates good opportunities for sport.

The second largest lake of Hungary is Lake Fertő on the border with Austria. Its water level and shore line have been changed over time very widely. The greater part of its surface is covered with reeds, huge quantities of which are used industrially. A quarter of the lake's area of  lies in Hungary, with the other three-quarters in Austria. The adjacent marshy Hanság was drained by the Hanság Canal.

The third largest lake in Hungary, Lake Velence is a steppe lake in an advanced stage of alluviation. It is a popular holiday resort, being close to  Budapest.

Swamps and marshes
The Little Balaton was originally a part of the larger lake, but now it is mostly a swamp and marsh area at the south-western corner of the Balaton with a highly characteristic wildlife. It is a protected natural reserve.

Before the extensive controls of the 19th century there were a lot of marshes and swamps in the country like the Sárrét of Transdanubia or the Ecsed Moorland close to the north-eastern corner of the country. They have been drained, reclaimed and transformed into land fit for farming.

Spring-water lakes are a special class of natural lakes in Hungary. They are fed mostly by warm springs, but karstic ones also occur (Lake Hévíz, the Malom Pool in Budapest, Tapolca). The alkaline Lake Fehér near Szeged has no outlet. It is a famous nature reserve in Körös-Maros National Park.

Underground water

Underground water is very important in Hungary, especially on the Great Plain. Stratum water is abundant because Hungary is in the middle of the Carpathian Basin. These water resources are between two impermeable strata underlying the first impervious stratum beneath the underground water. They are predominantly of rainfall origin, mostly not from Hungary, but from the surrounding higher-lying parts of the Carpathian Basin. This water, when brought to the surface from great depths, is rich in various mineral solutions and may be very hot.

Deep boring for stratum water has been carried out throughout the country. There are about twenty-eight thousand artesian wells in the Great Plain alone, out of a total of thirty-five thousand for the whole country. In the hilly and mountainous regions of Mesozoic limestone, karstic water is also important.

Budapest dam 
It is understood that a large earth dam was built upstream of Budapest, downstream of Vienna in the latter part of the 20th century, amassing a considerable quantity of water into an artificial lake, and should this earth bank break, similarly to what happened at Kolontar, 2010, and Vajont 1963 Budapest would be flooded uncontrollably. It is a matter of historical record that the building of this Danube Dam was banned in the Diplomatic District of London in advance by a march and a Note Verbale handed in to the Austrian Embassy, and colour photographs being taken of the principal participants in the action. What is this?

See also 
 List of rivers of Hungary

References

Sources

 

Hydrography by country
Geography of Hungary